The 2014–15 Las Vegas Legends season was the third season of the Las Vegas Legends professional indoor soccer club. The Las Vegas Legends, a Pacific Division team in the Major Arena Soccer League, split their home games between the Orleans Arena in Paradise, Nevada, and the Las Vegas Sports Park in Las Vegas, Nevada. 

The team was led by owner Meir Cohen and head coach Doug Borgel with assistant coach Peter Sharkey. The Legends earned a 13–7 record in the regular season, placing them third in the Pacific Division and in the playoffs. They defeated the Ontario Fury and San Diego Sockers to win the Pacific Division Final before losing to the Monterrey Flash in the Western Conference Championship.

Season summary
Las Vegas struggled to start the season, earning a shootout win at home over the Turlock Express then losing twice on the road to the San Diego Sockers (with an at-home loss to the Missouri Comets in between). The Legends beat the Sockers at Orleans Arena then dropped games to the Ontario Fury and Turlock. Finding their footing in mid-December, Las Vegas won 5 consecutive games, including a two-goal win over then-unbeaten Monterrey Flash at Arena Monterrey. A stumble in January saw the Legends lose 2 of 3 games but they finished the season with 5 straight wins (including a win over the then-unbeaten Baltimore Blast) to end the regular season with a 137 record. This was good enough for third place in the Pacific Division and a spot in the post-season. They defeated Ontario then San Diego to claim the Pacific Division crown and moved on to the MASL Western Conference championship against Monterrey but lost both home and road games, ending their playoff run.

History
The Legends, a Professional Arena Soccer League expansion team in 2012–13, were successful in the 2012–13 season, compiling a 13–3 record in the regular season and clinching the Southwestern Division title. The team advanced to the postseason but ultimately fell to the San Diego Sockers 6–5 in overtime in the PASL National Championship Semi-Finals.

They found equal success in the 2013–14 season, earning a 13–3 record and 1st place in the PASL's Pacific Division. In the post-season, they defeated the San Diego Sockers in the Pacific Division Final to advance to the PASL Final Four but fell to Hidalgo La Fiera in the Semi-Final match. They defeated the Cleveland Freeze in the consolation game to take third place overall in the league.

Off-field moves
In May 2014, the Professional Arena Soccer League added six teams from the failed third incarnation of the Major Indoor Soccer League and reorganized as the Major Arena Soccer League. With the league expansion and reorganization, the other Pacific teams for 2014–15 are California-based Ontario Fury, Sacramento Surge, San Diego Sockers, and Turlock Express plus the Washington-based Seattle Impact. The Impact's assets were purchased mid-season and the team replaced on the schedule by the Tacoma Stars.

On March 17, 2015, after Las Vegas was eliminated from the playoffs, owner Meir Cohen told the Las Vegas Review-Journal that he planned for Las Vegas to return next season but with a new head coach and a new playing venue. Cohen wants the Legends to split playing time at the Thomas & Mack Center on the University of Nevada, Las Vegas campus with the new Las Vegas Outlaws of the Arena Football League.

Roster moves
In advance of the February 1 league trade deadline, the Detroit Waza traded team owner and player Dominic Scicluna to the Legends. Scicluna also served as an assistant coach with Las Vegas.

Schedule

Pre-season

Regular season

 Seattle Impact shut down mid-season; franchise purchased by Tacoma Stars.
 Game originally scheduled to be played at Orleans Arena.
 Game originally scheduled to be played on February 21.

Post-season

Awards and honors
Las Vegas defender Enrique Tovar was selected for the 2014-15 MASL All-League Third Team.

Las Vegas' Hiram Ruiz earned honorable mention for the league's all-rookie team for 2014-15.

References

External links
Las Vegas Legends official website
Las Vegas Legends at Las Vegas Review-Journal

Las Vegas Legends
Las Vegas Legends
Las Vegas Legends 2014
Las Vegas Legends 2014
Las Vegas Legends 2014